Rose Graham  (16 August 1875 – 29 July 1963) was a British religious historian.

Life
Graham was born in London in 1875 to W. Edgar Graham and Jane ( Newton). She went to Notting Hill High School and then on to Somerville College, Oxford. She worked as a researcher and published books on church history beginning with her first on St Gilbert of Sempringham who had founded a double monastery. Graham was encouraged by her mother and with her she travelled in France to research her second book. She wasn't able to gain a degree until 1920 from Oxford. She was awarded a Doctor of Letters (DLitt) degree by Oxford in 1929. She was made an  Honorary Fellow of Somerville College in 1933, and worked as a member of the Royal Commission on Historical Monuments from 1934 to 1963.

In 1945 she became the first female president of the British Archaeological Association which she held until 1951 when she served on as vice president until 1963. She had also been elected a Fellow of the Society of Antiquaries of London (FSA) and a Fellow of the Royal Historical Society  (FRHistS).

She died on 29 July 1963. Her early work on ecclesiastical history is seen as a great foundation for later scholarship on women's history.

References

1875 births
1963 deaths
Writers from London
Historians of Christianity
People educated at Notting Hill & Ealing High School
First women admitted to degrees at Oxford
Alumni of Somerville College, Oxford
British historians of religion
British women historians
Commanders of the Order of the British Empire
Fellows of the Society of Antiquaries of London
Fellows of the Royal Historical Society
People of the Royal Commission on the Historical Monuments of England
Contributors to the Victoria County History